Ernest Harold Jones (1877-1911) was a British artist and excavator. He contracted tuberculosis and in 1904 he decided to go to Egypt to relieve his symptoms. He worked with John Garstang, of Liverpool, from 1904–07 and then for Theodore M. Davis and Emma Andrews from 1907-11. He died of tuberculosis in Luxor, Egypt, in March 1911.

Early life

Young life 
Jones was born in Barnsley on March 7, 1877 to William Jones and Mary Anne Sprake. His father was the Headmaster of the Barnsley School of Art and then the Carmarthen School of Art. Jones was educated at Queen Elizabeth's Grammar School in Carmarthen. By the time he was 18, he was teaching at the Carmarthen School of Art.

Art training and health 
In 1902, Jones won a scholarship to the Royal College of Art in London. By 1904, his health had deteriorated so much from tuberculosis that he had to leave London. He was a good enough artist that he was able to join John Garstang's excavations in Egypt that same year.

Work in Egypt 

He began work with John Garstang of Liverpool in the 1903-04 season, but in the 1904-05 season became an excavator and an illustrator of the project at Beni Hasan. In July 1904, there was an exhibition at the Society of Antiquaries of London. Jones' paintings of artifacts, Egyptian landscapes, and some of the excavation staff were displayed.

He continued working for Garstang until 1907, but quickly grew tired of the isolation of the sites of Abydos and Beni Hasan. The American millionaires Theodore Davis and Emma Andrews offered him more money for less work in the bustling town of Luxor, and by February 1907, he was working for them.

He worked on their excavations in the Valley of the Kings, for which Davis and Andrews held the concession. Jones worked mostly on their houseboat, the dahabeyah Beduin, painting larger objects coming out of tombs they cleared in the Valley. He worked with Davis and Andrews on notable excavations of KV 54 and KV 55. He wrote a number of letters home to his family, remarking on the friendships he made with the Davis and Andrews crew. He appreciated their friendship and care, and looked forward to many years of work with them.

Death and legacy 
In the 1910-11 season, he returned to Luxor to work with Davis and Andrews again. He had planned on writing a book about his experience and publishing more of his paintings. But his tuberculosis had gotten so bad he could hardly leave his bed. He died in Luxor on 10 March 1911. He is buried in the Christian Cemetery in Luxor.

Notes

People from Barnsley